Liang Yan (simplified Chinese: 梁艳, born October 4, 1961) is a Chinese volleyball player, who competed in the 1984 Summer Olympics.

In 1984, she was a member of the Chinese volleyball team which won the gold medal. She played all five matches. She is the only player to win all 5 straight major titles for China women's national volleyball team, during 1981-1986.

Awards

National team
 1981 World Cup -  Gold Medal
 1982 World Championship -  Gold Medal
 1984 Olympic Games Los Angeles -  Gold Medal
 1985 World Cup -  Gold Medal
 1986 World Championship -  Gold Medal

External links
 profile

1961 births
Living people
Chinese women's volleyball players
Volleyball players at the 1984 Summer Olympics
Olympic volleyball players of China
Olympic gold medalists for China
Volleyball players from Shanxi
Olympic medalists in volleyball
Asian Games medalists in volleyball
Volleyball players at the 1982 Asian Games
Volleyball players at the 1986 Asian Games
Medalists at the 1982 Asian Games
Medalists at the 1986 Asian Games
Asian Games gold medalists for China
Medalists at the 1984 Summer Olympics
People from Lüliang
20th-century Chinese women